Satanic is a 2006 American horror film directed by Dan Golden and starring Annie Sorell, Jeffrey Combs, Angus Scrimm and James Russo.

Plot
The powers of darkness converge to claim the soul of a young girl who may have made a deal with the devil, who has come to collect. As a result of a devastating car accident that claims the life of her father, Michelle wakes up in a hospital in a state of amnesia—and her face is completely destroyed from the crash. With no recollection of the supernatural events before the accident that took her father, she has to figure out why people around her are mysteriously dying; she must try to remember if she has any chance of saving herself and her loved ones from this dark force. After her doctor perfectly reconstructs her face using family pictures as a guide, Michelle is discharged from the hospital and sent to a home that lodges young offenders, as she was deemed a delinquent before the car crash. On the very day she leaves the hospital, the janitor is murdered.

Michelle is troubled by a series of hellish nightmares and the Mephistophelean force that is killing the people in her life who seem to be committing suicide. A police detective named Joyner suspects that she is somehow responsible for the murders. Michelle desperately attempts to solve the mystery of her malevolent past in order to save herself and those around her before it is too late. Despite her gallant efforts, the legions of the damned eventually take her away.

Cast
Annie Sorell as Michelle
Jeffrey Combs as Detective Joyner
Angus Scrimm as Dr. Barbary
James Russo as Eddie
Brett Erickson as Larry
Eliza Swenson as Dalia
Brian Burnett as Dutch
Diane Goldner as Jackie
Rick Dean as Bisson
Lauren Emmel as Kayla
George Tovar as the Father
Michael Gaglio as Cliff
Matteo Indelicato as Mike
Priscilla Jones as the Father's girlfriend

External links
 
 

2006 films
2006 horror films
American supernatural horror films
Films set in Los Angeles
2000s English-language films
Films directed by Dan Golden
2000s American films